PDOC may refer to:

 Pdoc software
 PetroDar Operating Company
 Prolonged disorder of consciousness